Valtura is a village in the municipality of Ližnjan, in northern Istria in Croatia. In 2001 it had a population of 636.

References

Populated places in Istria County